Artarmon is a suburb on the lower North Shore of Sydney, in the state of New South Wales, Australia, 9 kilometres north-west of the Sydney central business district, in the local government area of the City of Willoughby.

History
In 1794 and 1796, land grants were given to soldiers and emancipists to encourage farming. The most important farm was owned by William Gore (1765–1845), who was the provost marshal under NSW Governor William Bligh. Gore Hill is named after him.

The Chatswood South Uniting Church, located at the corner of Mowbray Road and the Pacific Highway, designed by architect and later mayor of Manly, Thomas Rowe, was built in 1871. A sandstone church in the Gothic style, it features a small belfry flanking the eastern front of the building. Immediately to the west is a small cemetery, with graves going back to 1871. The building was extended in 1883 and 1930; it is now listed on the (now-defunct) Register of the National Estate. The cemetery is listed by the National Trust and is known as the Pioneer's Memorial Reserve.

Artarmon Post Office opened on 1 December 1909.

Since its urban growth, Artarmon has endured as a family-oriented suburb for its versatility of lush greenery.

Heritage listings 
Artarmon has a number of heritage-listed sites, including:
 559 Pacific Highway: Chatswood Reservoirs No. 1 and No. 2

Demographics
The next-most common countries of birth were China 9.8%, India 4.8%, England 3.3%, Hong Kong 2.9%, and Japan 2.4%. About 50.9% of people only spoke English at home. Other languages spoken at home included Mandarin 11.5%, Cantonese 6.6%, Japanese 3.3%, Korean 2.7%, and Nepali 2.4%. The most common responses for religious affiliation were no religion 36.7%, Catholic 18.1%, and Anglican 10.0%. The median weekly household income for Artarmon was AU$2,183, significantly higher than the national median of $1,438.

Commercial area
Artarmon has a mix of residential, commercial, and industrial areas. High-rise buildings are located to the west of the railway line, and houses are to the east. Also, an industrial area is south of the Gore Hill Freeway, although the suburb retains a rather leafy feel. A long row of shops is located beside the railway station on Hampden Road and several restaurants are in Wilkes Avenue on the eastern side of the station. Artarmon Public Library is one of the branch libraries in the City of Willoughby.

Media
The studios of the Special Broadcasting Service, a public television station, are located in Herbert Street. The Australian Broadcasting Corporation was until recently located on the Pacific Highway, at Gore Hill. Fox Sports is headquartered on Broadcast Way near the Pacific Highway at Gore Hill. The Seven Network and Ten Network broadcast from a high transmission tower, operated by TXA in Hampden Road. The Nine Network has its studios in the adjacent suburb of Willoughby.

The Artarmon Fair is held annually in May.

Transport
Artarmon railway station is on the North Shore & Western Line of the Sydney Trains network. The Gore Hill Freeway meets the Pacific Highway at Artarmon. Willoughby Council has started a free shuttle bus in between St. Leonards and the Artarmon industrial area. Buses to the Sydney CBD operate from the Pacific Highway.

Schools
Artarmon Public School, opened in 1910, is a primary school serving the local community. It is one of the best schools to study in academically and is the only school with 2 Opportunity Classes (OC). It was ranked 1st in 2018.

Places of worship
 St Basil's Artarmon Anglican Church www.artarmonchurch.org
 Artarmon Islamic Mosjid

Notable residents
Photographer Max Dupain had his studio in Artarmon from 1971 until his death in 1992.

References

External links

Artarmon – community profile
Artarmon Progress Association
Artarmon Public School
  [CC-By-SA]

 
Suburbs of Sydney
Populated places established in 1794
1794 establishments in Australia
City of Willoughby